Marda is a Palestinian town located in the Salfit Governorate of the State of Palestine, in the northern West Bank, 18 kilometers Southwest of Nablus. According to the Palestinian Central Bureau of Statistics, it had a population of 1,992 in 2007.

Location
It is bordered by Iskaka and Jamma'in villages to the east, Salfit to the south, Kifl Haris and Qira villages to the west, and Jamma'in village to the north. The Israeli settlement of Ariel lies immediately south of Marda.

History
The village is mentioned by name in the Samaritan Chronicle. According to Ellenblum, no remains from the Byzantine era have been found here.

During the Crusader period, Diya' al-Din (1173–1245) writes that there was a Muslim population in the village,   and that followers of Ibn Qudamah lived here. The maternal grandmother of Diya' al-Din came from Marda.

Yakut (1179–1229) noted that Marda was a "village near Nablus."

Sherds from the Crusader/Ayyubid and Mamluk era have been found here. An important Hanbali judge, Amin-ed-dyn 'Abd-er-Rahman, was born in the village in the early 15th century.

Ottoman era
Marda was incorporated into the Ottoman Empire in 1517 with all of Palestine, and in 1596 it appeared in the tax registers under the name of Marda, as being in the nahiya ("subdistrict") of Jabal Qubal, part of the Sanjak of Nablus. It had a population of 163 household; who were all Muslims. They paid a fixed tax-rate of 33,3 % on agricultural products, including wheat, barley, summer crops, olive trees, goats and beehives, in addition to occasional revenues, a press for olive oil or grape syrup, and a market toll; a total of 25,634 akçe. All of the revenue went to a Muslim charitable endowment. During this era it was an important market town, one of the largest in the area. Sherds from the early Ottoman era have been found here.

In 1838, Edward Robinson noted it as a village, Merda, in the Jurat Merda district, south of Nablus.

In 1870 Victor Guérin   observed: "the mosque, now partly destroyed, lies east and west, and seems to have succeeded a Christian church. Before it lies a platform, beside which are a cistern and a small birket. There are also several broken capitals lying on the ground."

In 1882, the PEF's Survey of Western Palestine described Merdah as: "a village of moderate size on low ground surrounded by olives."

British Mandate era
In the 1922 census of Palestine conducted by the British Mandate authorities, Marda had a population of 290 Muslims, increasing in the 1931 census to 356 Muslims in 103 occupied houses. 

In the 1945 statistics the population was 470 Muslims while the total land area was 9,021 dunams, according to an official land and population survey. Of this, 1,796 were allocated for plantations and irrigable land, 3,176 for cereals, while 72 dunams were classified as built-up areas.

Jordanian era
In the wake of the 1948 Arab–Israeli War, and after the 1949 Armistice Agreements, Marda came under Jordanian rule. 

The Jordanian census of 1961 found 852 inhabitants in Marda.

Post-1967
Since the Six-Day War in 1967, Marda has been under Israeli occupation. 

After the 1995 accords, 15.8% of village land is defined as Area B land, while the remaining 84.2% is Area C land. According to ARIJ, Marda has suffered "numerous Israeli confiscations for the benefit of the various Israeli objectives," including the confiscations of 2,566 dunums (29%) of village land in order to establish the Israeli settlement of Ariel just south of Marda. In addition, land was confiscated from Salfit, Kifl Haris and Iskaka villages for Ariel. 

According to what the head of the village council told HRW: “We used to have 10,000 animals, now you can barely find 100, because there is nowhere for them to graze. So the economy collapsed and unemployment increased.” He further noted, that as a result of the Israeli land confiscations, many of the Marda villagers now have little choice but to work in Israeli settlements.

On 14 May 2021, as part of the 2021 demonstrations, 38 year old Sharif Khaled Suleiman was killed.

References

Bibliography

 

   (p. 809)

External links
Welcome to Marda
Survey of Western Palestine, Map 14:  IAA, Wikimedia commons 
 Marda Village (Fact Sheet), Applied Research Institute–Jerusalem (ARIJ)
Marda Village Profile, ARIJ
 Marda, aerial photo, ARIJ  
 Development Priorities and Needs in Marda, ARIJ 

Towns in Salfit Governorate
Salfit Governorate
Municipalities of the State of Palestine